Carlota Island is an inhabited volcanic island in the province of Romblon in the Philippines. It is part of barangay Nasunogan in the municipality of Banton. In the 1918 census, the island together with its sister island Isabel Island constituted one single barrio named Islas de las Dos Hermanas with 23 inhabitants.

See also
 List of islands of the Philippines

Islands of Romblon
Inactive volcanoes of the Philippines